Richard Rust (July 13, 1938 – November 9, 1994 ) was an American actor of stage, television, and film born in Boston, probably best remembered for his role as a young lawyer in NBC's Sam Benedict series (1962–1963).

Early years
Rust attended a Massachusetts boarding school and the University of Miami, where he was an archery champion. After majoring in drama at Miami, he enhanced his skills at the Neighborhood Playhouse.

Stage 
Rust first acted professionally in a 1951 production of The Milky Way at Southbury Playhouse in Connecticut. In 1957, Rust was chosen as a replacement in Eugene O'Neill's Long Day's Journey into Night. His other Broadway credit was One by One (1964).

Film 
In 1958, Rust signed a contract with Columbia Pictures, along with other young Hollywood aspirants Michael Callan and Yvonne Craig. He appeared in 1959 in The Legend of Tom Dooley, a Western film starring Michael Landon. Rust was cast in 1960 in the crime drama film, This Rebel Breed, about rival narcotics gangs in high schools. Also in 1960, he portrayed Dobie with Randolph Scott in the Western film Comanche Station.

His films in 1961 included William Castle's Homicidal, a thriller starring Glenn Corbett, and Underworld U.S.A., a study of revenge starring Cliff Robertson. He had the role of Oliver in the 1962 film Walk on the Wild Side with Barbara Stanwyck and Laurence Harvey.

In 1969, he appeared in the Roger Corman biker cult film Naked Angels. His last named role was in 1990 as Sheriff Blanchfield in the film Double Revenge about a bystander who goes on a rampage against a bank robber.

Television 
In 1959, Rust appeared in the episode "Well of Gold" of the NBC children's western series, Buckskin, starring Tom Nolan. He also appeared in several western television programs, including Black Saddle with Peter Breck, The Man from Blackhawk starring Robert Rockwell, The Rifleman starring Chuck Connors, Gunsmoke with James Arness, Tales of Wells Fargo starring Dale Robertson, Johnny Ringo with Don Durant, and Have Gun – Will Travel with Richard Boone. He twice guest starred on ABC/Warner Brothers series, Bourbon Street Beat with Andrew Duggan, and 77 Sunset Strip with Efrem Zimbalist, Jr. Rust guest starred on other ABC/WB programs too, including Sugarfoot with Will Hutchins, Bronco with Ty Hardin, Lawman with John Russell, and The Roaring 20s. Rust appeared on the syndicated series, The Brothers Brannagan with Stephen Dunne and Mark Roberts, and Rescue 8, with Jim Davis and Lang Jeffries. He guest starred too on James Franciscus's short-lived CBS series The Investigators.

In 1962, Rust procured the role of the 24-year-old attorney Henry Tabor on Sam Benedict, with Edmond O'Brien. Sixty other actors sought the role but Rust prevailed because of his acting experience and his educational background. The series, which ran for 28 episodes, was slated against the new variety programs launched by Roy Rogers and Dale Evans on ABC, which proved unsuccessful too, and Jackie Gleason on CBS. After Sam Benedict, Rust appeared in various television programs, including Gary Lockwood's The Lieutenant, which occupied the former time slot on Saturday nights held the previous year by Sam Benedict. He guest starred on three episodes of Have Gun – Will Travel starring Richard Boone, two episodes of Perry Mason with Raymond Burr, Bonanza, Christopher George's The Rat Patrol, and Cade's County with Glenn Ford. Rust appeared as James Vining in 1975 on the ABC Daytime soap opera General Hospital.

Filmography

References

External links
 
 
 
 
 

1938 births
1994 deaths
American male television actors
American male stage actors
American male film actors
People from Greater Los Angeles
Male actors from Boston
20th-century American male actors
Male actors from New York City
University of Miami alumni